The 2010 Copa do Brasil was the 22nd edition of the Copa do Brasil, starting on February 10 and ended on August 4. It was contested by 64 clubs, either qualified through their respective state championships (54) or by the CBF Rankings (10). Clubs that qualified for the 2010 Copa Libertadores did not take part because of scheduling conflicts.

Format
The competition is a single elimination knockout tournament featuring two-legged ties. In the first two rounds, if the away team wins the first match by 2 or more goals, it progresses straight to the next round avoiding the second leg. The away goals rule is also used in the Copa do Brasil. The winner qualifies for the 2011 Copa Libertadores, which prevents a team from winning the Copa do Brasil twice in a row.

Team information

Qualified by state championships and other competitions
54 spots in the tournament are allocated to all the 27 State federations to indicate either one, two or three clubs, depending on their status in CBF State ranking. Criteria may vary, but usually state federations indicate clubs with best records in the state championships or other special competitions organized by such institutions.

Qualified by CBF club ranking
Ten spots are reserved for the top 10 clubs in CBF club ranking, excluding those qualified by state competitions and clubs playing in 2010 Copa Libertadores.

Brackets
Teams that play in their home stadium in the first leg are marked with †.

Section 1

Section 2

Section 3

 São Raimundo was penalized 3 points due to player irregular registration.

Section 4

Final phase

References

External links

2010 domestic association football cups
2010
2010 Brazilian football competitions